The Tomorr Mountain National Park is a national park founded in 1956 that lies in southern Albania, nestled in the central and higher portions of the Tomorr massif, spanning an area of  since 2012, and expanded to include its quarry areas since 2019. The area falls within the Berat County and only  inside the Elbasan County. The park was established in 1956 and is considered one of the most important protected areas for the maintenance of mountainous biodiversity and ecosystem integrity at the national level. The park has been recognised as an Important Plant Area of international importance by Plantlife.

Tomorr is an anticline composed of limestones and karst. The mountain is one of the highest natural points of southern Albania, rising between the valleys of the rivers Osum and Tomorrica in the east close to Berat.

The park falls within the Pindus Mountains mixed forests terrestrial ecoregion of the Palearctic Mediterranean forests, woodlands, and scrub biome. Its varied geology and topography have resulted in a unique diversity of flora and fauna. Forests of the Tomorri National Park are composed of diverse species of deciduous and coniferous trees and a great variety of flowers. The park's forests are abundant in species such as European beech, Bosnian pine, Turkish hazel, linaria, great yellow gentian, autumn crocus, Greek whitebeam, European mistletoe, centaury and many others. Numerous species of large mammals such as wolves, foxes, wild boars, roe deer, wild goats, rabbits, golden eagles, owles, and sparrowhawks can be found inside the national park. Small mammals include forest dormouse, and wood mouse.

Prominent features within the national park include the Osum canyon, Osum river and Tomorr massif, which is also a sacred site of both Christians and Bekatshis.

See also  
 Tomorr 
 Geography of Albania
 Protected areas of Albania

References

Bibliography

 

National parks of Albania
Tourist attractions in Albania
Geography of Berat County
Tourist attractions in Berat County
Protected areas established in 1956
1956 establishments in Albania
Forests of Albania